Jurdin Jesus "JJ" Modina Romualdo (born July 26, 1960) is a Filipino politician from the province of Camiguin in the Philippines. He is currently serving as the Representative of Camiguin's lone district since 2022 and previously from 1998 to 2007. He was also elected Governor of the province from 2007 to 2016 and from 2019 to 2022.

References

External links
Province of Camiguin Official Website

1960 births
Living people
Nationalist People's Coalition politicians
Lakas–CMD politicians
Members of the House of Representatives of the Philippines from Camiguin
People from Camiguin
Governors of Camiguin